The National Cadet Corps (NCC) is a youth organisation in Sri Lanka, sponsored by the Ministry of Defence, which operates in schools, and normally includes Army, Navy and Air Force sections. The corp is open for secondary school students on voluntary basis and its officers are government teachers and educational administrators, who serve as instructors. The Cadets are given basic military training in small arms and parades, as well as leadership training.

Currently administrated under the Mobilization and Supplementary Forces Act, No. 40 of 1985, it was established in 1881 and was formally known as the Ceylon Cadet Corps.  The officers and cadets have no liability for active military service. Officers many volunteer for secondment to the Sri Lanka Armed forces during national emergencies or be mobilized under National Service. Traditionally the Cadet Corps has served as a source for officers for the regular forces of the Sri Lankan military. The NCC is headed by a Director of Major General rank.

Mission
The Mission of the National Cadet Corps is to train and inspire cadets using effective training curriculum, so that each cadet shall develop character, courage, sportsmanship, self-reliance, discipline, and civil mindedness, spirit of adventure, responsibility and comradeship to be a human resource of well-trained youth, capable of providing leadership in all aspects of life.

History
1881 – Mr. John B. Cull, the then principal of Royal College, Colombo formed a cadet platoon as a Volunteer Unit under Ceylon Light Infantry for the students of the Royal College.
1902 – Introduction of Cadet Battalion under CLI (Ceylon Light Infantry) and Major S. M. Baros of CLI became the first Commanding Officer of the Cadet Battalion.
1903-Training was conducted by school teachers and Diyatalawa Volunteer Army training camps were conducted with British and Indian troops.
1917 – The First Hermen Loos (All Island) Camp was held in Diyathalawa. The Champions were Kingswood College, Kandy
1918 – With the recommendation of Brigadier General R. B. Fell (Commander, Ceylon Defence Force), formation of Ceylon Cadet Battalion took place on the two divisions on 4 February 1918.
1948 – Colonel R.J.F. Mendis was appointed as the first Sri Lankan commanding officer of the Ceylon Cadet Battalion.
1971 – Eight officers were mobilised for duties with the Regular Force during the period of JVP insurrection in various parts of the island.
1972 – Ceylon Cadet Corps changed its designation as Sri Lanka Cadet Corps after Ceylon declared itself a Republic.
1981 – Centenary Celebrations of Cadet Corps was held in Colombo.
1985 – Action was taken to amalgamate Sri Lanka Cadet Corps and the Police Cadet Corps under the Manpower Mobilization and Auxiliary Forces Act, No. 40 of 1985.
1985 – Girls Platoons were started in ten main cities of the island.
1988 – Sri Lanka Cadet Corps, which was part of the Sri Lanka Army Volunteer Force changed its designation as the National Cadet Corps, and it was ceremonially inaugurated on 29 April 1988 by J. R. Jayewardene, the then President of Sri Lanka under the above Act.
1990 – The National Cadet Corps Training Centre, Rantembe was established on 2 December 1990 by General Cyril Ranathunga, VSV the Secretary, Ministry of Defence.
1995 – A total 98 officers including 25 lady officers were mobilised to serve in the operational areas. Some of them were posted to Army HQ, SLMA, KDA and Sri Lanka Navy for various duties.
2001 – The Ministry of Defence took over Sri Gunalankara Vidyalaya from the Ministry of Education and established the HQ National Cadet Corps at Kalubowila on 18 May 2001.
2006 – 125th Anniversary celebrations.

Organization

Headquarters
Headquarters National Cadet Corps – Colombo
General Staff Branch
Corps' Secretary Branch
Admin Quartering Branch
Procurement Branch
Finance Branch
Headquarters Battalion

Battalions
National Cadet Corps has 34 Battalions located in; 

1st NCC Battalion – Galle 
2nd NCC Battalion – Kandy 
3rd NCC Battalion – Colombo
4th NCC Battalion – Kurunagala 
5th NCC Battalion – Anuradhapura
6th NCC Battalion – Badulla 
7th NCC Battalion – Gampaha
8th NCC Battalion – Rathnapura
9th NCC Battalion – Kegalla
10th NCC Battalion – Tangalla 
11th NCC Battalion – Polonnaruwa
12th NCC Battalion – Kalutara 
13th NCC Battalion – Matale
14th NCC Battalion – Kuliyapitiya 
15th NCC Battalion – Monaragala
16th NCC Battalion – Matara
17th NCC Battalion – Ampara
18th NCC Battalion – Nuwara Eliya
19th NCC Battalion – Padukka
20th NCC Battalion – Jaffna
21st NCC Battalion – Trincomalee
22nd NCC Battalion – vavuniya
23rd NCC Battalion – Kundasale 
24th NCC Battalion – Debarawewa
25th NCC Girl Battalion – North Western Province
26th NCC Girl Battalion – Western Province
27th NCC Girl Battalion – Southern Province
28th NCC Girl Battalion – Central Province
29th NCC Girl Battalion – Sabaragamuwa Province
30th NCC Girl Battalion – Northern Province 
31st NCC Girl Battalion – Eastern Province
32nd NCC Girl Battalion – North Central Province
33rd NCC Girl Battalion – Uwa Province 
34th NCC Battalion – Mulathivu 
35th NCC Battalion – Puttlam
36th NCC Battalion – Kilinochchi
37th NCC Battalion – Mannar
38th NCC Battalion – Batticoloa
 NCC Training Centre, Rantambe

Training
NCC officers are trained in the National Cadet Corps officers' course at the Volunteer Force Training School, Diyatalawa. All Cadets undergo practical and theoretical training at their platoon and company level in the areas such as Physical Fitness, Foot Drill, Weapon Training and Firing, Map Reading, Field Craft, First Aid, Regimental Duties, Confidence Building Course, Leadership Activities, Fire Fighting, etc. Annually assessment camps at battalion level are held at NCC Training Centre, Rantambe while Naval Cadet assessment camps are held in the Naval and Maritime Academy and Air Force Cadet assessment Camps of the SLAF Diyatalawa. The standard issued service weapon of NCC is the T56-2 variant of the Type 56 assault rifle.

Trophies
 Hermann Loos Championship Trophy – awarded annually to the best performing cadet platoon from a boys' school since 1917, named after Hermann Albert Loos a senior District Judge of Ceylon 
 De Soysa Champion – awarded annually to the best performing cadet platoon from a girls' school
 Lt General T I Weeratunga Challenge Sheeld - awarded annually to the best performing Western Cadet Band from a boys school
 Best Eastern Band Championship Trophy 
 Junior Cadet Championship Trophy (Since 2016)

Training Course 

 Junior Leadership Course for Cadets & Sramabimani
 Cadets' Advance Course
 Probationary Officers' Course
 Young Officers' Course
 Officers' Training Course
 Junior Command Course
 Senior Command Course
 Band Platoons Commanders' Course
 Band NCOs, Course for Cadets
 Computer Course for Cadets
 Computer Course for ORs
 Computer Course for Three Forces and Police Officers
 English Language course for Cadets
 English Language Course for ORs
 English Language Course for Tri-Forces and Police Officers
 Sinhala Language Course for Cadets
 Sinhala Language Course for ORs
 Tamil Language Course for Cadets
 Tamil Language Course for ORS
 Tamil Language Course for Tri-Forces and Police Officers
 Drivers' Course
 Counselling Course
 University Entrance Course
 PSI Course
 Clerks Course

Ranks within the NCC

Officers
Major General
Brigadier
Colonel
Lieutenant Colonel
Major
Captain
Lieutenant
2nd Lieutenant
Probationary officer

Cadets
Warrant Officer I
Warrant Officer II 
Staff Sergeant 
Sergeant 
Corporal 
Lance Corporal 
Cadet

Supplementary ranks
Regiment Sergeant Major (RSM)
Regiment Quarter Master Sergeant (RQMS)
Company Sergeant Major (CSM)
Company Quarter Master Sergeant (CQMS)
Corps Regimental Sergeant Major – Senior Warrant Officer 1 (one in a Corps)
Battalion Regimental Sergeant Major – Warrant Officer 1 (one in a battalion)
Battalion Regimental Quarter Master Sergeant – Senior Warrant Officer 2 (one in a battalion)
Company Sergeant Major – Warrant Officer 2 (one in a Company)
Company Quarter Master Sergeant – Staff Sergeant  (one in a Company)
Sergeant (five in a Company excluding the CSM and CQMS/depend on the platoons in the company)
Corporal (fifteen in a Company)
Lance Corporal (fifteen in a Company)
Cadet

Past Commanding officers (1902-1987) 
Major SM Borrous 1902–1905
Major James Von Langenberg ED CLI 1905–1915
Major WE Gratiaen 1916–17
Major Edvin Evans 1917–1920
Col LMCD Robison ED 1920–1932 
Col S. A. Pakeman CBE, MC, ED  1932–1938
Col Robert Patrick ED 1938–1943
Col R.J.F. Mendis OBE ED 1943–1948
Lt Col HVC De Silva ED 1948–1951
Col R Sabanayagam OBE 1951–1955
Bvt Col TN Munasinghe ED 1955–1960
Lt Col HCF Abeykoon ED 1960–61
Lt Col HSR Gunawardana 1961–1965
Lt Col P. D. Ramayanayake 1965–1968
Lt Col EA Perusinghe ED 1968–69 
Bvt Col GW Rajapaksha ED 1969–1973
Bvt Col KPG Nilame ED 1973–1977
Bvt Col RB Narampanawa ED 1977–1980 
Bvt Col NBS Balalle 1980–1984
Lt Col HKDA Fernando 1984–1987

Past Directors (1988-Present) 
Maj Gen E. G. Thevanayagam, VSV 1987–1991
Col HW Senevirathna (Actg)  1991
Brig Justus B Rodrigo, VSV 1991–1994 
Maj Gen T. N. De Silva, USP  1994–1999 
Col YL Kulasooriya (Actg)  1999–2000
Brig GSM Ranathunga, USP  2000–2002 
Col RM Somapala (Actg)  2002
Maj Gen WR Wijerathne, USP  2002–2004 
Brig DHMRB Thammita, RSP 2004–05
Maj Gen GBW Jayasundara, RWP, RSP 2005–2013
Maj Gen HMHA Herath  2013–2015
Maj Gen LWCBB Rajaguru, RWP, RSP, USP 2015–16
Maj Gen AKP Wickramasinghe, VSV, USP 2016 to 2018
Maj Gen MMS Perera 2018 to 2019
maj Gen PWB Jayasundara VSV,USP, ndc 2019-

See also
 Cadet
 Army Cadet Force
 Community Cadet Forces
 Australian Defence Force Cadets
 Bangladesh National Cadet Corps
 Canadian Cadet Organizations
 Combined Cadet Force
 Junior Reserve Officers' Training Corps
 National Cadet Corps (Ghana)
 National Cadet Corps (India)
 National Cadet Corps (Singapore)
 New Zealand Cadet Forces

References

External links
 Web site
 Disciplined citizens needed for country to prosper: PM

Youth organisations based in Sri Lanka
Military of Sri Lanka
Military youth groups
Military education and training in Sri Lanka
Military units and formations of Ceylon in World War II
Military units and formations established in 1881